Valdemar Christian of Schleswig-Holstein (1622–26 February 1656) was the son of king Christian IV of Denmark and his morganatic spouse Kirsten Munk. He had the title Count of Schleswig-Holstein.

Biography 
Born as the youngest legitimate son of King Christian IV of Denmark, he had a tough childhood. His elder half-brother Ulrik had succeeded (under the name Ulrich III) his uncle as a bishop of Schwerin. He was raised under the supervision of the royal governess Karen Sehested. In 1643, he was sent to Russia to marry Irene of Russia, the daughter of Tsar Michael of Russia, but as he refused to convert to the Orthodox faith, he was kept prisoner until 1645. In 1648, he came into conflict with his half-brother Frederik III of Denmark because of his wish to be elected king instead of Frederick, and after this, he lived abroad. He served in the Swedish army from 1655 and was killed in Poland in 1656.

Ancestry

References 
 http://runeberg.org/nfck/0214.html (In Danish)

1622 births
1656 deaths
Danish nobility
17th-century Danish people
Children of Christian IV of Denmark
Sons of kings